Tetrapteron is a genus of flowering plants belonging to the family Onagraceae.

Its native range is Northern America.

Species:
 Tetrapteron graciliflorum (Hook. & Arn.) W.L.Wagner & Hoch 
 Tetrapteron palmeri (S.Watson) W.L.Wagner & Hoch

References

Onagraceae
Onagraceae genera